is a railway station located in the city of Yamagata, Yamagata Prefecture, Japan, operated by the  East Japan Railway Company (JR East).

Lines
Higashi-Kanai Station is served by the Aterazawa Line, and is located 3.1 rail kilometers from the terminus of the line at Kita-Yamagata Station.

Station layout
The station has one side platform serving a single bi-directional track. The station is unattended.

Surrounding area
 
 Kanai Junior High School
 Kanai Elementary School

History
Higashi-Kanai Station began operation on December 25, 1951. With the privatization of the JNR on April 1, 1987, the station came under the control of the East Japan Railway Company.

See also
List of railway stations in Japan

References

External links

  Higashi-Kanai Station (JR East)

Stations of East Japan Railway Company
Railway stations in Yamagata Prefecture
Aterazawa Line
Railway stations in Japan opened in 1950
Yamagata, Yamagata